Erich Meyer (born 6 August 1951) is an Austrian engineer, amateur astronomer and discoverer of asteroids.

Astronomical career 

Between 1996 and 1999, using the private observatory Meyer/Obermair in Davidschlag (municipality Kirchschlag bei Linz, Austria), he discovered a total of 21 asteroids. Seven of these asteroids were discovered together with his colleague Erwin Obermair and one together with Herbert Raab. Furthermore, he was involved in six other discoveries of asteroids between 1996 and 2005, which were assigned as site discoveries to the observatory Davidschlag by the International Astronomical Union.

Meyer's most important observations include precisie astrometry of the comet Shoemaker–Levy 9, which he observed together with Erwin Obermair and Herbert Raab in 1993. These observations have significantly contributed to the subsequent prediction of the impact of this comet on the planet Jupiter. In 2018 Erich Meyer was able to identify the residential house of Johannes Kepler in Linz in Hofgasse (house no. 7) - after 400 years.

Meyer is a member of the Astronomical Society of Linz (Linzer Astronomische Gemeinschaft). By profession, he works as an engineer in the field of maintenance of industrial plants.

Awards and honors 

On 4 April 1997 Meyer was presented the Decoration of Honour for Services to the Republic of Austria  (Silver) of the republic of Austria. The asteroid 7940 Erichmeyer was named in his honor on 10 June 1998.  In 2005, Meyer was awarded a "Gene Shoemaker NEO Grant" by the Planetary Society to support his work on near-Earth objects.

List of discovered minor planets

See also

References 
 

20th-century Austrian astronomers
Discoverers of asteroids
21st-century Austrian astronomers
1951 births

Living people
Scientists from Linz